Summit Power Group is a Seattle-based energy development company, responsible for developing electric power plants and other energy-related facilities, which are primarily natural gas-fired and wind-powered, with solar power recently added. Summit does not develop conventional coal-fired power plants without carbon capture. Summit's prospective IGCC/CCS projects include the Texas Clean Energy Project, the Renewable Energy Corporation Project in Montana, and surface facilities for underground coal gasification (UCG) projects in the early stages of development by Laurus Energy as a licensee of Ergo Exergy.

References

External links 
 Summer Power Group, Inc website
 Laurus Energy website
 Ergo Exergy website

Electric power companies of the United States